Równa may refer to the following places in Poland:
Równa, Lower Silesian Voivodeship (south-west Poland)
Równa, Łódź Voivodeship (central Poland)